The Roman Catholic Diocese of Cuauhtémoc-Madera is a Latin suffragan diocese in the ecclesiastical province of the Metropolitan Archdiocese of Chihuahua (northern Mexico).

Its cathedral episcopal see is the Catedral de San Antonio, dedicated to Saint Anthony of Padua, in Cuauhtémoc, Chihuahua State. 
It also has a Co-Cathedral, the former see of the territorial prelature of Madera : Cocatedral de San Pedro, dedicated to Saint Peter, in Madera, also in Chihuahua State.

Statistics 
As per 2014, it pastorally served 353,296 Catholics (86.8% of 406,980 total) on 37,405 km² in 26 parishes with 42 priests (32 diocesan, 10 religious), 67 lay religious (10 brothers, 57 sisters) and 9 seminarians.

History 
It was erected as the Territorial Prelature of Madera on 25 April 1966, on territories split off from the Metropolitan Archdiocese of Chihuahua, Diocese of Ciudad Juárez and Diocese of Ciudad Obregón.

Its name was changed after its new see when it was elevated to bishopric as Diocese of Cuauhtémoc-Madera (a double name reflecting new and former see) on 17 November 1995, having gained more territory, again from the Archdiocese of Chihuahua, which became its Metropolitan.

Bishops

Ordinaries 
(all Roman Rite)

Apostolic Administrator Father Justo Goizueta Gridilla, Augustinian Recollects (O.A.R.) (1967 – 1970.01.14 see below)

Territorial Prelates of Madera 
 Justo Goizueta Gridilla, O.A.R. (see above 1970.01.14 – retired 1988.02.02), Titular Bishop of Egara (1970.01.14 – 1978.02.15); died 1991
 Renato Ascencio León (1988.07.19 – 1994.10.07), later Bishop of Ciudad Juárez (Mexico) (1994.10.07 – 2014.12.20)

Suffragan Bishops of Cuauhtémoc–Madera
 Juan Guillermo López Soto (17 November 1995 - 8 September 2021), no previous prelature; died from COVID-19 on September 8, 2021

Other priest of this diocese who became bishop
Constancio Miranda Wechmann, appointed Bishop of Atlacomulco, México in 1998

See also 
 Cuauhtémoc, Chihuahua
 Madera, Chihuahua

References

Sources, external links and references 
 
 GCatholic, with Google map and - satellite photo

Cuauhtemoc-Madera
Cuauhtemoc-Madera, Roman Catholic Diocese of
Cuauhtemoc-Madera
Cuauhtemoc-Madera